The Willow Park Stable in Rocky Mountain National Park was designed by National Park Service landscape architect Daniel Ray Hull and built in 1926. The National Park Service Rustic style stables and the nearby Willow Park Patrol Cabin were built to house crews maintaining the Fall River Road.

See also
National Register of Historic Places listings in Larimer County, Colorado

References

External links

Government buildings on the National Register of Historic Places in Colorado
Commercial buildings completed in 1926
Government buildings completed in 1926
National Register of Historic Places in Rocky Mountain National Park
Transportation buildings and structures in Larimer County, Colorado
National Park Service rustic in Colorado
Historic American Buildings Survey in Colorado
National Register of Historic Places in Larimer County, Colorado
Stables in the United States
1926 establishments in Colorado